Robyn Beckley Vining (born November 11, 1976) is an American politician currently serving in the Wisconsin State Assembly.  She represents the northern half of the city of Wauwatosa, in Milwaukee County, as well as the northern half of the city of Brookfield, in Waukesha County.

Biography

Robyn Vining was born on Wright-Patterson Air Force Base in Ohio.  She attended school in Austin, Texas, before ultimately graduating from James Madison High School in Vienna, Virginia, in 1996.  She received her bachelor's degree in Psychology and Studio Art from James Madison University, and earned a master's degree in Theology and Culture from Trinity Evangelical Divinity School in 2002.

Vining was a pastor for a time.  She moved to the Milwaukee area in 2008 and started her own small business as a photographer. In 2012, she co-founded the non-profit organization Exploit No More, focused on ending child sex trafficking.  She is also co-founder of the non-profits Help Portrait Milwaukee and The Milwaukee Portrait Project.

In 2017, she was named American Mothers' Wisconsin Mother of the Year.

In 2018, when incumbent state representative Dale Kooyenga announced that he would seek election to the Senate rather than re-election to the Assembly, Vining decided to run for the open seat.  She entered the Democratic primary campaign, but her would-be opponent, Chris Rockwood, after meeting with her, decided to withdraw from the race and endorse her candidacy instead.

Her opponent in the general election was incumbent Wisconsin State Treasurer Matt Adamczyk, who had decided to seek election to the Assembly rather than run for re-election as State Treasurer. The election was close, and an error on election night initially showed Adamczyk the winner by 35 votes. However, the error was discovered and the final certified result showed Vining winning the election by 138 votes.

Personal life and family

Vining is married to Jim Vining and has two children. They reside in Wauwatosa, Wisconsin.

Electoral history

References

External links
 Representative Robyn Vining Official Website
 Robyn Vining Campaign Website
 Robyn Vining Photography, LLC, Website
 Exploit No More Website

1976 births
Living people
Democratic Party members of the Wisconsin State Assembly
Women state legislators in Wisconsin
People from Greene County, Ohio
People from Wauwatosa, Wisconsin
James Madison University alumni
Trinity Evangelical Divinity School alumni
21st-century American politicians
21st-century American women politicians